Dom Henrique of Portugal, Duke of Viseu (4 March 1394 – 13 November 1460), better known as Prince Henry the Navigator, was a central figure in the early days of the Portuguese Empire and in the 15th-century European maritime discoveries and maritime expansion. Through his administrative direction, he is regarded as the main initiator of what would be known as the Age of Discovery. Henry was the fourth child of King Dom John I of Portugal, who founded the House of Aviz.

After procuring the new caravel ship, Henry was responsible for the early development of Portuguese exploration and maritime trade with other continents through the systematic exploration of Western Africa, the islands of the Atlantic Ocean, and the search for new routes. He encouraged his father to conquer Ceuta (1415), the Muslim port on the North African coast across the Straits of Gibraltar from the Iberian Peninsula. He learned of the opportunities offered by the Saharan trade routes that terminated there, and became fascinated with Africa in general; he was most intrigued by the Christian legend of Prester John and the expansion of Portuguese trade. He is regarded as the patron of Portuguese exploration.

Life 

Henry was the third surviving son of King John I and his wife Philippa, sister of King Henry IV of England. He was baptized in Porto, and may have been born there, probably when the royal couple was living in the city's old mint, now called Casa do Infante (Prince's House), or in the region nearby. Another possibility is that he was born at the Monastery of Leça do Balio, in Leça da Palmeira, during the same period of the royal couple's residence in the city of Porto.

Henry was 21 when he and his father and brothers captured the Moorish port of Ceuta in northern Morocco. Ceuta had long been a base for Barbary pirates who raided the Portuguese coast, depopulating villages by capturing their inhabitants to be sold in the African slave trade. Following this success, Henry began to explore the coast of Africa, most of which was unknown to Europeans. His objectives included finding the source of the West African gold trade and the legendary Christian kingdom of Prester John, and stopping the pirate attacks on the Portuguese coast.

At that time, the cargo ships of the Mediterranean were too slow and heavy to undertake such voyages. Under Henry's direction, a new and much lighter ship was developed, the caravel, which could sail farther and faster. Above all, it was highly maneuverable and could sail "into the wind", making it largely independent of the prevailing winds. The caravel used the lateen sail, the prevailing rig in Christian Mediterranean navigation since late antiquity.
With this ship, Portuguese mariners freely explored uncharted waters around the Atlantic, from rivers and shallow waters to transocean voyages.

In 1419, Henry's father appointed him governor of the province of the Algarve.

Resources and income 
On  May 25 1420, Henry gained appointment as the Grand Master of the Military Order of Christ, the Portuguese successor to the Knights Templar, which had its headquarters at Tomar in central Portugal. Henry held this position for the remainder of his life, and the Order was an important source of funds for Henry's ambitious plans, especially his persistent attempts to conquer the Canary Islands, which the Portuguese had claimed to have discovered before the year 1346.

In 1425, his second brother the Infante Peter, Duke of Coimbra, made a diplomatic tour of Europe, with an additional charge from Henry to seek out geographic material. Peter returned with a current world map from Venice.

In 1431, Henry donated houses for the Estudo Geral to teach all the sciences—grammar, logic, rhetoric, arithmetic, music, and astronomy—in what would later become the University of Lisbon. For other subjects like medicine or philosophy, he ordered that each room should be decorated according to the subject taught.

Henry also had other resources. When John I died in 1433, Henry's eldest brother Edward of Portugal became king. He granted Henry all profits from trading within the areas he discovered as well as the sole right to authorize expeditions beyond Cape Bojador. Henry also held a monopoly on tuna fishing in the Algarve. When Edward died eight years later, Henry supported his brother Peter, Duke of Coimbra for the regency during the minority of Edward's son Afonso V, and in return received a confirmation of this levy.

Henry functioned as a primary organizer of the disastrous expedition to Tangier in 1437 against Çala Ben Çala, which ended in Henry's younger brother Ferdinand being given as hostage to guarantee Portuguese promises in the peace agreement. The Portuguese Cortes refused to return Ceuta as ransom for Ferdinand, who remained in captivity until his death six years later. Prince Regent Peter supported Portuguese maritime expansion in the Atlantic Ocean and Africa, and Henry promoted the colonization of the Azores during Peter's regency (1439–1448). For most of the latter part of his life, Henry concentrated on his maritime activities and court politics.

Vila do Infante and Portuguese exploration 

According to João de Barros, in Algarve, Prince Henry the Navigator repopulated a village that he called Terçanabal (from terça nabal or tercena nabal). This village was situated in a strategic position for his maritime enterprises and was later called Vila do Infante ("Estate or Town of the Prince").

It is traditionally suggested that Henry gathered at his villa on the Sagres peninsula a school of navigators and map-makers. However modern historians hold this to be a misconception. He did employ some cartographers to chart the coast of Mauritania after the voyages he sent there, but there was no center of navigation science or observatory in the modern sense of the word, nor was there an organized navigational center.

Referring to Sagres, sixteenth-century Portuguese mathematician and cosmographer Pedro Nunes remarked, "from it our sailors went out well taught and provided with instruments and rules which all map makers and navigators should know."

The view that Henry's court rapidly grew into the technological base for exploration, with a naval arsenal and an observatory, etc., although repeated in popular culture, has never been established. Henry did possess geographical curiosity, and employed cartographers. Jehuda Cresques, a noted cartographer, has been said to have accepted an invitation to come to Portugal to make maps for the infante. Prestage makes the argument that the presence of the latter at the Prince's court "probably accounts for the legend of the School of Sagres, which is now discredited."

Henry's explorations 

Henry sponsored voyages, collecting a 20% tax (o quinto) on profits, the usual practice in the Iberian states at the time. The nearby port of Lagos provided a convenient home port for these expeditions. The voyages were made in very small ships, mostly the caravel, a light and maneuverable vessel equipped by lateen sails. Most of the voyages sent out by Henry consisted of one or two ships that navigated by following the coast, stopping at night to tie up along some shore.

During Prince Henry's time and after, the Portuguese navigators discovered and perfected the North Atlantic volta do mar (the 'turn of the sea' or 'return from the sea'): the dependable pattern of trade winds blowing largely from the east near the equator and the returning westerlies in the mid-Atlantic. This was a major step in the history of navigation, when an understanding of oceanic wind patterns was crucial to Atlantic navigation, from Africa and the open ocean to Europe, and enabled the main route between the New World and Europe in the North Atlantic in future voyages of discovery. Although the lateen sail allowed sailing upwind to some extent, it was worth even major extensions of course to have a faster and calmer following wind for most of a journey. Portuguese mariners who sailed south and southwest towards the Canary Islands and West Africa would afterwards sail far to the northwest—that is, away from continental Portugal, and seemingly in the wrong direction—before turning northeast near the Azores islands and finally east to Europe in order to have largely following winds for their full journey. Christopher Columbus used this on his transatlantic voyages.

Madeira 
The first explorations followed not long after the capture of Ceuta in 1415. Henry was interested in locating the source of the caravans that brought gold to the city. During the reign of his father, John I, João Gonçalves Zarco and Tristão Vaz Teixeira were sent to explore along the African coast. Zarco, a knight in service to Prince Henry, had commanded the caravels guarding the coast of Algarve from the incursions of the Moors. He had also been at Ceuta.

In 1418, Zarco and Teixeira were blown off-course by a storm while making the volta do mar westward swing to return to Portugal. They found shelter at an island they named Porto Santo. Henry directed that Porto Santo be colonized. The move to claim the Madeiran islands was probably a response to Castile's efforts to claim the Canary Islands. In 1420, settlers then moved to the nearby island of Madeira.

The Azores 
A chart drawn by the Catalan cartographer, Gabriel de Vallseca of Mallorca, has been interpreted to indicate that the Azores were first discovered by Diogo de Silves in 1427. In 1431, Gonçalo Velho was dispatched with orders to determine the location of "islands" first identified by de Silves. Velho apparently got as far as the Formigas, in the eastern archipelago, before having to return to Sagres, probably due to bad weather.

By this time the Portuguese navigators had also reached the Sargasso Sea (western North Atlantic region), naming it after the Sargassum seaweed growing there (sargaço / sargasso in Portuguese).

West African coast 
In 1424 Cape Bojador was the most southerly point known to Europeans on the west coast of Africa. For centuries, superstitious seafarers held that beyond the cape lay sea monsters and the edge of the world. However, Prince Henry was determined to know the truth. He was persistent and sent 15 expeditions over a ten year period to pass the dreaded Cape. Each returned unsuccessful. The captains gave various excuses for having failed. Finally, in 1434 Gil Eanes, the commander of one of Henry's expeditions, became the first known European to pass Cape Bojador since Hanno almost two millennium before.

Using the new ship type, the expeditions then pushed onwards. Nuno Tristão and Antão Gonçalves reached Cape Blanco in 1441. The Portuguese sighted the Bay of Arguin in 1443 and built an important “forte-feitoria” (a fort protecting a trading post) on the island of Arguin around the year 1448. Dinis Dias soon came across the Senegal River and rounded the peninsula of Cap-Vert in 1444. By this stage the explorers had passed the southern boundary of the desert, and from then on Henry had one of his wishes fulfilled: the Portuguese had circumvented the Muslim land-based trade routes across the western Sahara Desert, and slaves and gold began arriving in Portugal. This rerouting of trade devastated Algiers and Tunis, but made Portugal rich. By 1452, the influx of gold permitted the minting of Portugal's first gold cruzado coins. A cruzado was equal to 400 reis at the time. From 1444 to 1446, as many as forty vessels sailed from Lagos on Henry's behalf, and the first private mercantile expeditions began.

Alvise Cadamosto explored the Atlantic coast of Africa and discovered several islands of the Cape Verde archipelago between 1453 and 1456. In his first voyage, which started on 22 March 1455, he visited the Madeira Islands and the Canary Islands. On the second voyage, in 1456, Cadamosto became the first European to reach the Cape Verde Islands. António Noli later claimed the credit. By 1462, the Portuguese had explored the coast of Africa as far as present-day Sierra Leone. Twenty-eight years later, Bartolomeu Dias proved that Africa could be circumnavigated when he reached the southern tip of the continent, now known as the Cape of Good Hope. In 1498, Vasco da Gama became the first European sailor to reach India by sea.

Origin of the "Navigator" nickname 
No one used the nickname "Henry the Navigator" to refer to prince Henry during his lifetime or in the following three centuries. The term was coined by two nineteenth-century German historians: Heinrich Schaefer and Gustave de Veer. Later on it was made popular by two British authors who included it in the titles of their biographies of the prince: Henry Major in 1868 and Raymond Beazley in 1895. In Portuguese, even in modern times, it is uncommon to call him by this epithet; the preferred use is "Infante D. Henrique".

Contrary to his brothers, Prince Henry was not praised for his intellectual gifts by his contemporaries. It was only later chroniclers such as João de Barros and Damião de Góis who attributed him a scholarly character and an interest for cosmography. The myth of the "Sagres school" allegedly founded by Prince Henry was created in the 17th century, mainly by Samuel Purchas and Antoine Prévost. In nineteenth-century Portugal, the idealized vision of Prince Henry as a putative pioneer of exploration and science reached its apogee.

Travels in Brazil, in the Years 1817–1820: Undertaken by Command of His Majesty the King of Bavaria by Dr. J.B. Von Spix and Dr. C.F.P. Von Martius, published 1824, refers to the introduction of sugar cane to Brazil by "the Infant Don Henrique Navegador".

Fiction 
 Arkan Simaan, L'Écuyer d'Henri le Navigateur, Éditions l'Harmattan, Paris. Historical novel based on Zurara's chronicles, written in French.

Ancestry

See also 
 Prince Henry the Navigator Park
 Hermitage of Our Lady of Guadalupe

Notes

References

Sources 

  Ariganello, Lisa. Henry the Navigator : prince of Portuguese exploration (2007); for elementary schools. online
 
 
 
 Bradford, Ernle. A Wind from the North: The Life of Henry the Navigator (1960) online or Southward the Caravels: The Story of Henry the Navigator (UK edition, 1961)
 
 
 Elbl, Ivana.  "Man of His Time (and Peers): A New Look at Henry the Navigator." Luso-Brazilian Review 28.2 (1991): 73-89. online
 
 
 
 
 
 

1394 births
1460 deaths
15th-century explorers of Africa
Dukes of Viseu
History of the Atlantic Ocean
Henry
Knights of the Garter
Order of Christ (Portugal)
People from Porto
Portuguese people of British descent
Portuguese infantes
Maritime history of Portugal
14th-century Portuguese people
15th-century Portuguese people
Donatários of the Azores
Portuguese exploration in the Age of Discovery
Sons of kings